Jatashanker Tripathi is an Indian politician and a member of 17th Legislative Assembly of Kushinagar, Uttar Pradesh of India. He represents the Khadda constituency of Uttar Pradesh and is a member of the Bharatiya Janata Party.

Political career
Tripathi is a member of the 17th Legislative Assembly of Uttar Pradesh. He is a member of the Bharatiya Janata Party and since 2017, has represented the Khadda constituency. he defeated Bahujan Samaj Party candidate Vijay Pratap Kushwaha by a margin of 38,497 votes.

Posts held

See also
Uttar Pradesh Legislative Assembly

References

Uttar Pradesh MLAs 2017–2022
Bharatiya Janata Party politicians from Uttar Pradesh
Living people
1968 births